The Aachener was a German automobile, built by the Aachen Steel Works and offered for sale in 1902.  The company mainly made engines ranging in power from 1¾ hp to 11 hp (1.3 to 8 kW).  It also made automotive components.  The complete cars were later marketed under the name "Fafnir".

Defunct motor vehicle manufacturers of Germany

de:Aachener